Shirang-e Olya (also Romanized as Shīrang-e ‘Olyā; also known as Shīrang-e Bālā) is a village in Shirang Rural District, Kamalan District, Aliabad County, Golestan Province, Iran. At the 2006 census, its population was 2,206, in 521 families.

References 

Populated places in Aliabad County